Liam Murphy is a fictional character from Home and Away

Liam Murphy may also refer to:

 Liam Murphy (Gaelic footballer)
 Liam Murphy (athlete), Australian racewalker
 Liam Murphy, footballer for Cork City F.C.